Tim Cain is an American video game developer.

Tim Cain may also refer to:

 Tim Cain, a member of the American rock band Sons of Champlin

See also
 Tim Kaine (born 1958), American attorney and politician
 Tim Kane (born 1968), American economist
 Timothy Cain (disambiguation)